Kolucheh (also Romanized as Kolūcheh and Kelūcheh; also known as Kolcheh and Kūlchāh) is a village in Babarashani Rural District, Chang Almas District, Bijar County, Kurdistan Province, Iran. At the 2006 census, its population was 87, in 21 families. The village is populated by Kurds.

References 

Towns and villages in Bijar County
Kurdish settlements in Kurdistan Province